Stelgistrum is a genus of marine ray-finned fishes belonging to the family Cottidae, the typical sculpins. These fishes are found in the northern Pacific Ocean.

Taxonomy
Stelgistrum was first proposed as a monospecific genus in 1898 by the American ichthyologists David Starr Jordan and Charles Henry Gilbert when they described Stelgistrum stejnegeri from Robben Island in the Sea of Okhotsk. The 5th edition of Fishes of the World classifies the genus Stelgistrum within the subfamily Cottinae of the family Cottidae, however, other authors classify the genus within the subfamily Psychrolutinae of the family Psychrolutidae.

Species
There are currently three recognized species in this genus:
 Stelgistrum beringianum Gilbert & Burke, 1912
 Stelgistrum concinnum Andriashev, 1935 (Largeplate sculpin)
 Stelgistrum stejnegeri Jordan & Gilbert, 1898

References

Cottinae
Taxa named by David Starr Jordan
Taxa named by Charles Henry Gilbert